Newnan–Coweta County Airport  is a public use airport in Coweta County, Georgia, United States. It is owned by the Newnan & Coweta County Airport Authority. It is surrounded by US 29 and I-85 and  owned by the county.

The airport name appears in various formats, depending on the source. The FAA refers to it as both Newnan Coweta County Airport and Newnan–Coweta County Airport. The Georgia DOT airport directory adds a hyphen/dash for Newnan–Coweta County Airport. The City of Newnan's website drops "County" from the name, resulting in Newnan–Coweta Airport. Coweta County's website drops both "County" and the hyphen/dash, for Newnan Coweta Airport and also has a photo of a sign at the airport bearing that name.

It is included in the National Plan of Integrated Airport Systems for 2011–2015, which categorized it as a general aviation facility.

Facilities and aircraft 
Newnan–Coweta County Airport covers an area of 270 acres (109 ha) at an elevation of 970 feet (296 m) above mean sea level. It has one runway designated 15/33 with an asphalt surface measuring 5,500 by 100 feet (1,676 x 30 m).

For the 12-month period ending December 31, 2012, the airport had 50,000 general aviation aircraft operations, an average of 136 per day. At that time there were 100 aircraft based at this airport: 85% single-engine, 13% multi-engine, 2% jet, and 6% helicopter.

References

External links 
 Aerial image as of February 1993 from USGS The National Map
 

Airports in Georgia (U.S. state)
Buildings and structures in Coweta County, Georgia
Transportation in Coweta County, Georgia